Esparza is a Basque surname. Notable people with the surname include:

Antonio Esparza (born 1962), Spanish cyclist
Audrey Esparza (born 1986), American actress
Carla Esparza (born 1987), American mixed martial artist
Carlos Esparza (1828–1885), Mexican soldier, spy and poet
Emmanuel Esparza (born 1976), Spanish actor
Felipe Esparza (born 1970), Mexican-American stand-up comedian and actor
Fernando Gómez Esparza (born 1953), Mexican politician
Gabriel Esparza (born 1973), Spanish taekwondo practitioner
Gabriel Esparza (footballer) (born 1993), Argentine footballer
Itziar Esparza (born 1974), Spanish swimmer
Javier Esparza (born 1964), Spanish computer scientist
Javier Esparza (politician) (born 1970), Spanish politician
Jesús Arturo Esparza (born 1990), Mexican long-distance runner
José Esparza (born 1945), Venezuelan virologist 
José Gregorio Esparza (1802–1836) the last Texan defender to enter the Alamo with his family
Jokin Esparza (born 1988), Spanish footballer
Jonathan Esparza (born 1999), American soccer player
José Guadalupe Esparza (born 1954), Mexican musician
Manuel Esparza (born 1951), Spanish cyclist
Marlen Esparza (born 1989), American boxer
Maximiliano Silerio Esparza, Mexican politician
Miguel Gerónimo de Esparza (1678–1767), Spanish nobleman and colonial governor
Moctesuma Esparza (born 1949), American filmmaker
Omar Esparza (born 1988), Mexican footballer
Rafa Esparza (born 1981/82), American performance artist
Ramón de Esparza (fl. 1390), Navarrese nobleman
Raúl Esparza (born 1970), American stage actor
Rigoberto Esparza (born 1983), Mexican football manager and player
Wendolly Esparza (born 1991), Mexican-American journalist and model

References

Basque-language surnames
Surnames